Visicom Media is a developer focused on devising tools and software applications that improve user experience.

They are known for developing tools, platforms and software products for large publishers and partners such as Yahoo!, Comcast, Verizon, Time Warner and Panda Security.

History 
Visicom Media was founded in 1996 by Patrice Carrénard, Dominique Tremblay and Nicolas Xanthopoulos.  Since then, they have partnered with various brands in the world of distribution, development, and marketing.

Visicom's products include:
 AceHTML Pro — editing software for HTML websites, similar to Microsoft FrontPage 
 AceFTP Pro
 AceDesign Pro
 VMN.net—search portal
 DynamicToolbar.com and MyStartToolbar.com—browser toolbar for MyStart.com, also used by many third-party websites for branded toolbars
 Toolbarcleaner.com
 ManyCam.com, a virtual webcam for Windows & Mac.
 MyStart.com, a homepage extension for web browsers.

Main products

ManyCam 
ManyCam is a live video play software and virtual webcam for professionals and users looking to enhance their video conferences, live streams and online classes.

Mystart 
MyStart combines smart start pages with integrated paid searches, creating revenue opportunities and providing users with images and tools.

Search products 
As a syndicator of Yahoo's Sponsored Search Ad Play Feed for more than a decade, Visicom Media produces software that leverages Yahoo! Search to generate click-through revenue.

References

Brossard
Online companies of Canada
Companies based in Quebec